The Rōshānī movement ("the enlightened movement") was a populist, nonsectarian Sufi movement that was founded in the mid-16th century and arose among Afghan tribes. The movement was founded by the Afghan or Pashtun warrior, poet, Sufi and revolutionary leader Bayazid Ansari, who is more commonly known as Pir Roshan ("Saint of Light Pir (sufi master)"). Bayazid challenged the inequality and social injustice that he saw being practiced by the ruling powers of the Mughal empire. He advocated for a system of egalitarian codes and tenets that his followers, the Roshaniyya, promulgated within Islam. Bayazid educated and instructed followers of the movement through new and radical teachings that questioned basic Islamic canons during that time, and propagated egalitarian principles. His teachings resonated among the Afridi, Orakzai, Khalil, Mohmand, and Bangash tribes of Afghanistan.

The Roshaniyya were a millenarian Sufi group popular with Afghan populations in the northwestern regions of the Mughal Empire. The group achieved strong influence and authority among the eastern Pashtun tribes and played a significant role in Pashtun history and in the policy of the Mughal Empire on its western frontiers. The movement itself was a challenge to Afghan tribal society, and its purpose was to raise issues of leadership, authority, and social ethics. It's leaders were the followers and disciples of Bayazid Ansari, and membership within the movement threatened to undermine traditional tribal leadership. The Roshaniyya movement went through three phases: the first phase lasted between 1565 to 1585, the second phase from 1585 to 1605, and the third phase from 1605 to 1632.

Bayazid Ansari, Pir Roshan
Bayazid Ansari was born in 1525, and had an early experience of victimization at the hands of the Mughals that persisted throughout his lifetime and ultimately led to his leadership of an insurrection against the Mughal government in Kabul. At a young age, Bayazid was sent to master the Qur'an and through his studies he became more devout in his worship of God. He was educated, well-traveled, familiar with mysticism, and had first hand experience with resentment of the Afghans over the Mughal monopoly of political and military power. For a few years during his studies, he attained what he considered to be union with God but kept his mystical experiences to himself. Eventually, he began to accept disciples.

Bayazid preached a life of poverty, fasting, and remembrance of God which appealed to the poorer classes of Kaniguram. As his disciples grew, the local ulama and sufi pirs claimed Bayazid and his disciples were frauds who sought worldly wealth and knew nothing of true religion. When asked which sufi tradition he followed, he responded that he followed the divine tradition. The millenarian quality of his messages came through his emphasis on the renunciation of worldly pursuits and on the imminence of the day of resurrection.

Followers
Since Afghan tribesmen have traditionally considered religious law and religious leaders to be at odds with tribal law or Pashtunwali, they may have been attracted to Bayazid's particular emphasis on mysticism at the expense of the shari'at and his condemnation of the religious establishment. However, by accepting Bayazid's message and Bayazid, they simply swapped one religious leader for another. Furthermore, some tribal sardars viewed the Roshaniyya movement as a source of possible strength for themselves within their own intratribal rivalries. Poorer individuals, lineages, and tribes were attracted to Bayazid's teachings about the need for prayer, fasting, and poverty in preparation for the Day of Judgement, because it gave meaning to their lives. Lastly, poorer tribes were attracted to Bayazid's assertion that anyone who failed to adhere to the movement could be prosecuted as an infidel and that such person's lands and possessions would be plundered. It is also important to note that Bayazid originally wrote his Khair al-Bayan in Pashto, which meant that the text was more accessible to Afghans than the Arabic Quran and that those followers took some measure of pride in its composition.

Bayazid's millenarian message of repentance and preparation for the Day of Judgement struck a particularly sympathetic chord in the religious sensibilities of Afghans. Afghans were also attracted to his more mystical approach to religion that deemphasized outward practices of the shari'at.

Response
In terms of disseminating his message, Bayazid publicized it extremely well. Messages and letters were sent continuously to surrounding areas and places in India and Central Asia. In the late 1560s while living in Hashtnaghar he sent his disciples with letters calling on people to join the movement, and accept him as a perfect guide.

A turning point for the movement happened in 1570 when the Tu'i tribe in Nangrahar, which had accepted Bayazid as the pir-i kamil, attacked a caravan and plundered it. When Bayazid got word that the caravan had been attacked, he sent an apology to Mirza Hakin in Kabul. Yet, Mirza Hakim's councilors had convinced him that Bayazid was responsible for the actions of the Tu'i tribe and sent a farman to either kill or capture Bayazid.

Shortly before his death and after spending time in hiding and on the run, Bayazid helped the Afridi and Orakza'i Afghans drive the Tirahis from Tirah.

Roshani tribal insurrection
Following the death of Bayazid Ansari, Father Monserrate, also known as "Jalala", became the leader of the Roshani Movement. He first went to Tirah, where he organized the Afridi and Orakza'i tribes in an outbreak of violence. The Afridis and Orakza'i attacked and plundered caravans, performed raids, and killed Afghans, Mughals, and Hindus indiscriminately. This provoked counter-attacks and after a series of defeats, many tribesmen deserted Jalala and he fled from Tirah to the Yusufza'is. In 1601, twenty years after assuming leadership of the Roshaniyya movement, Jalala and the Roshanis went to the aid of the Lohani Afghans in Ghazni. The Hazaras of that area however, attacked the Lohanis and when the Lohanis appealed to the Roshanis, they attacked the Roshanis too. The Roshani were pursued until they were eventually caught up with, and Jalala was killed. Jalala's death however, was not the end of the movement.

In Afghan history
The Roshaniyya movement was a religious, social, and political challenge to individual Afghans and non-Afghans, as well as to the Afghan tribes. Bayazid's emphasis on the ascetic life, mysticism, and repentance in anticipation of the Day of Judgement were themes that attracted numerous people and provoked an initially positive reaction from Afghan tribesmen. During Bayazid's lifetime and position as leader of the movement, the pantheistic sufi character of the Roshaniyya movement and its mass millenarian appeal were overwhelming. After Bayazid's death in 1575 the pantheistic sufi character of the movement became less and less prominent.

Roshaniyya doctrines were more mystical and less overtly legal, which made them more attractive to Afghans who found the shari'at to conflict with the tribal customs of Pashtunwali. The biggest challenge of the Roshaniyya movement to Pashtun tribal society happened when religious leaders competed with traditional lineage headmen for leadership of the tribesmen.

Contribution to Pashto language
The founder of the Roshani movement, Bayazid Pir Roshan, is credited with inventing a Pashto alphabet and writing one of the earliest known prose in Pashto. His alphabet paved the way for writing further literature and poetry in Pashto. The Roshani movement gave Pashto some famous poets in the 16th and 17th centuries.

References 

Sufi orders
Liberal and progressive movements within Islam